The Ministry of Health was a government ministry of the State of Pasundan. The ministry was responsible for the health system, vaccination programs, hospitals, and clinics in the State of Pasundan.

Transfer of power 
After the establishment of the Adil Cabinet on 8 May 1948, prime minister Adil Puradiredja appointed Maskawan as the Minister of Home Affairs. The formation of the ministry was done one month later, on 11 June 1948, after the handover of the authority from the Recomba (government commissioner for administrative affairs) to the Minister of Health. The instrument of transfer for this purpose was the Staatsblaad (State Gazette) 1948 No. 116.

Ministers

Bibliography

References

Notes

Government ministries of Pasundan
Ministries established in 1948
Ministries disestablished in 1950